Emile Sherman is an Australian film and television producer best known for producing the film The King's Speech (2010), for which he won an Academy Award for Best Picture and the BAFTA award for Best Film and Best British Film, and for executive producing television series Top of the Lake, which was nominated for an Emmy, BAFTA and Golden Globe award.  He has been nominated for three Academy Awards and won one; nominated for five BAFTAs and won three, and nominated for two Emmy Awards and won one.

Emile co-founded See-Saw Films with producing partner Iain Canning in 2008. Their offices are based in Sydney, Australia and London, UK.

Early life and education
Emile Sherman graduated from the University of New South Wales with degrees in arts and law, as well as a masters in arts. He is Jewish.

Career
Sherman was co-executive producer on Rabbit-Proof Fence (2002), starring Kenneth Branagh and directed by Phillip Noyce.  Feature films produced by him in the 2000s include Candy (2006) starring Heath Ledger and Geoffrey Rush, and Disgrace (2008) based on J. M. Coetzee's Booker Prize-winning novel of the same name.

Sherman co-founded See-Saw Films with UK producer Iain Canning in 2008. 

Sherman produced Jane Campion's Emmy Award-nominated TV series Top of the Lake (2013). The second series, Top of the Lake: China Girl, also directed by Campion, premiered at the Cannes Film Festival in 2017.

In 2016 Sherman produced Lion, winner of two BAFTA Awards, starring Dev Patel, Nicole Kidman and Rooney Mara.

In 2019, Sherman produced short-form British comedy series, State of the Union, which premiered on Sundance TV. The first season starred Rosamund Pike and Chris O'Dowd and won three Emmy Awards including Outstanding Short Form Comedy or Drama Series. In 2021, the series was renewed for a second season starring Brendan Gleeson and Patricia Clarkson.

In 2021, two TV series produced by Sherman were released: British TV series The North Water, written and directed by Andrew Haigh, starring Jack O'Connell and Colin Farrell, and Australian TV series Firebite, written by Warwick Thornton and Brendan Fletcher and directed by Thornton, Fletcher and Tony Krawitz.

In November 2021, Netflix released The Power of the Dog, starring Benedict Cumberbatch, Kodi Smit-McPhee, Kirsten Dunst and Jesse Plemons, See-Saw's second collaboration with Jane Campion. In 2022, the film won two BAFTAs including Best Film, and was nominated for 12 Academy Awards, with Campion going on to win Best Director. The film originally premiered at the 78th Venice International Film Festival and Campion was awarded the Silver Lion for Best Director.

See-Saw's TV projects set to release in 2022 include Slow Horses and The Essex Serpent for Apple TV+, and Heartstopper for Netflix. Upcoming films include Operation Mincemeat; The Stranger; and Florian Zeller's The Son.

In April 2022, Screen Australia announced funding for Immersion, a science fiction drama TV series to be directed by Garth Davis, written by Matt Vesely (Aftertaste) and executive produced by Sherman and director/producer Samantha Lang.

Other roles
In addition to his Managing Director role at See-Saw Films, Sherman is a director of Fulcrum Media Finance, a subsidiary of the company. Fulcrum Media Finance is a specialist film and television financier, providing cashflow for the Australian Producer Offset, Location and PDV Offsets as well as the New Zealand Screen Production Grant and the United Kingdom Film Tax Credit. Fulcrum has provided over $200 million in finance to film and television projects to date.

In 2019, Sherman and Canning teamed up with Garth Davis to form a new production company called I AM THAT, with Samantha Lang as head of development.

Sherman is also a director of animal protection institute Voiceless, and a director of the Sydney Writers’ Festival.

In 2021, Sherman launched a podcast with Lloyd Vogelman called Principle of Charity.  In the podcast, the hosts bring together two expert guests with opposing views on big social issues, and in addition to passionately advocating their own views, each guest is challenged to present the best, most generous version of the other’s argument.

Awards
2011: Academy Award for The King's Speech directed by Tom Hooper, starring Colin Firth, Geoffrey Rush and Helena Bonham Carter.

Filmography

Film

Television

Music Videos

References

External links
 
 See-Saw Films website

Living people
Year of birth missing (living people)
Australian film producers
Filmmakers who won the Best Film BAFTA Award
Golden Globe Award-winning producers
Producers who won the Best Picture Academy Award
Primetime Emmy Award winners
University of New South Wales Law School alumni